The 2014 Launceston Tennis International was a professional tennis tournament played on outdoor hard courts. It was the third edition of the tournament and part of the 2014 ITF Women's Circuit, offering a total of $50,000 in prize money. It took place in Launceston, Tasmania, Australia, on 3–9 February 2014.

Singles main draw entrants

Seeds 

 1 Rankings as of 27 January 2014

Other entrants 
The following players received wildcards into the singles main draw:
  Priscilla Hon
  Jessica Moore
  Jasmine Paolini
  Ellen Perez

The following players received entry from the qualifying draw:
  Naiktha Bains
  Nives Baric
  Kamonwan Buayam
  Ivana Jorović

Champions

Singles 

  Olivia Rogowska def.  Irena Pavlovic 5–7, 6–4, 6–0

Doubles 

  Monique Adamczak /  Olivia Rogowska def.  Kamonwan Buayam /  Zuzana Zlochová 6–2, 6–4

External links 
 2014 Launceston Tennis International at ITFtennis.com
 Tennis Australia Official website

2014 ITF Women's Circuit
2014 in Australian tennis
Launceston Tennis International
February 2014 sports events in Australia